Physalaemus gracilis is a species of frog in the family Leptodactylidae. It is found in southern Brazil, Uruguay, and adjacent Argentina, and likely also in Paraguay.
Its natural habitats are forest borders and Cerrado grasslands. It is an adaptable species that also occurs in heavily disturbed and polluted habitats. It breeds using foam nests in natural temporary pools. This abundant and widespread species is not facing major threats.

References

fernandezae
Amphibians of Argentina
Amphibians of Brazil
Amphibians of Uruguay
Taxonomy articles created by Polbot
Amphibians described in 1883